William Gillies McKinnon (born 24 January 1933) is a former Australian politician.

He was born in Barrhead, Scotland. In 1977 he was elected to the Tasmanian House of Assembly as a Labor member for Franklin in a recount following Bill Neilson's resignation. Defeated in 1979, he returned later that year in the recount that followed Eric Barnard's resignation. He was defeated in 1986.

References

1933 births
Living people
Members of the Tasmanian House of Assembly
Australian Labor Party members of the Parliament of Tasmania